Polymesoda floridana, or the maritime marsh clam, is a species of bivalve mollusc in the family Cyrenidae.

Distribution
It can be found off the Gulf of Mexico coast, ranging from Florida to Texas.

References

 Mikkelsen, P. M. & Bieler, R. (2007). Seashells of Southern Florida. Living marine mollusks of the Florida Keys and adjacent regions. Bivalves. Princeton: Princeton University Press. 503 pp.

External links
 Orbigny, A. d'. (1841-1853). Mollusques. In: R. de la Sagra (ed.). Histoire physique, politique et naturelle de l'Ile de Cuba. Arthus Bertrand, Paris. Vol 1: 1-264
 Morelet, A. (1851). Testacea novissima insulae Cubanae et Americae Centralis, Pars II. Paris: Baillière. 30 pp.

Cyrenidae
Bivalves described in 1846